Lyndall may refer to:

Lyndall Barbour (1916–1986), Australian actress, primarily of radio
Lyndall Bass (born 1952), American realist painter
Lyndall Fraker (born 1959), American politician
Lyndall Gordon (born 1941), British-based biographical and former academic writer
Lyndall Hadow (1903–1976), Western Australian short story writer and journalist
Lyndall Hobbs (born 1952), Australian film director and producer
Lyndall Jarvis, South African model and television presenter
Dorothy Lyndall (1891–1979), American dancer and dance educator
Lyndall Ryan, AM, FAHA (born 1943), Australian academic and historian
Lyndall Urwick MC (1891–1983), British management consultant and business thinker

See also
Lindahl (disambiguation)
Lindale (disambiguation)
Lindell (disambiguation)
Lindley (disambiguation)
Lindol (disambiguation)
Lyndale (disambiguation)